Michael Joseph Muldowney (August 10, 1889 – March 30, 1947) was a Republican member of the U.S. House of Representatives from Pennsylvania.

He was born in Philadelphia, Pennsylvania.  In 1894, he moved with his parents to Pittsburgh, Pennsylvania.  He was graduated from Duquesne University in Pittsburgh in 1908.  He was a member of the Pennsylvania State House of Representatives from 1925 to 1929.  He served in the city council of Pittsburgh from 1930 to 1933.

Muldowney was elected as a Republican to the Seventy-third Congress, but was an unsuccessful candidate for reelection in 1934.  He was a member of the State board of mercantile appraisers from 1935 to 1937.  He was appointed as the State Unemployment Compensation Referee in 1940 and served in that capacity until his death in Pittsburgh.  Muldowney was interred at Calvary Cemetery, Pittsburgh, Pennsylvania.

Sources

The Political Graveyard

1889 births
1947 deaths
Burials at Calvary Catholic Cemetery (Pittsburgh)
Republican Party members of the Pennsylvania House of Representatives
Duquesne University alumni
Pennsylvania city council members
Republican Party members of the United States House of Representatives from Pennsylvania
20th-century American politicians
Politicians from Philadelphia